Karen Young (born September 29, 1958) is an American film, television, and stage actress.

Early life and education
Young was born in Pequannock Township, New Jersey on September 29, 1958. She graduated from Douglass Residential College at Rutgers University as an English major.

Career
After graduation, Young moved to New York City and became an actress. She was working as a waitress when she saw an advertisement in Backstage that read: "Wanted: 24-year-old Irish Catholic girl with long blond hair." Young responded to the ad and ended up starring in Tony Garnett's 1983 vigilante thriller Handgun, for which she cut off her hair and in which she agreed to appear nude.

She also appeared in films such as 9½ Weeks, Heat (1986), Jaws: The Revenge, Night Game, The Wife, Daylight and Mercy. Young has also portrayed Sister Mary in The Orphan Killer (2011), and starred in many U.S. independent and foreign films including Heading South, Two Gates of Sleep and Conviction.

For television, Young portrayed FBI Agent Robyn Sanseverino on The Sopranos and has portrayed various characters for the Law & Order franchise, as well as in The Equalizer.

Her stage credits include roles in both New York productions of Sam Shephard's A Lie of the Mind, playing daughter Sally in 1985 and mother Lorraine in Ethan Hawke's 2010 production. Young and the rest of the cast were recognized as some of the "best performers of 2010" by Hilton Als in The New Yorker.

Personal life 
Young married actor Tom Noonan in 1992, and they had two children together before their 1999 divorce. She married Ken Eisen in 2012.

Filmography

Film

Television

References

External links

1958 births
Actresses from New Jersey
American film actresses
American stage actresses
American television actresses
Living people
People from Pequannock Township, New Jersey
Rutgers University alumni
20th-century American actresses
21st-century American actresses